A light-year, alternatively spelled light year, is a large unit of length used to express astronomical distances and is equivalent to about 9.46 trillion kilometers, or 5.88 trillion miles. As defined by the International Astronomical Union (IAU), a light-year is the distance that light travels in a vacuum in one Julian year (365.25 days). Because it includes the time-measurement word "year", the term light-year is sometimes misinterpreted as a unit of time.

The light-year is most often used when expressing distances to stars and other distances on a galactic scale, especially in non-specialist contexts and popular science publications. The unit most commonly used in professional astronomy is the parsec (symbol: pc, about 3.26 light-years) which derives from astrometry; it is the distance at which one astronomical unit subtends an angle of one second of arc.

Definitions
As defined by the IAU, the light-year is the product of the Julian year (365.25 days, as opposed to the 365.2425-day Gregorian year or the 365.24219-day Tropical year that both approximate) and the speed of light. Both of these values are included in the IAU (1976) System of Astronomical Constants, used since 1984. From this, the following conversions can be derived. The IAU-recognized abbreviation for light-year is "ly", although other standards like ISO 80000 uses "l.y." and localized abbreviations are frequent, such as "al" in French (from année-lumière), Spanish (from año luz), Italian (from anno luce), "Lj" in German (from Lichtjahr), etc.

{|
|-
|rowspan=6 valign=top|1 light-year     
|=  metres (exactly)
|-
|≈  petametres
|-
|≈  trillion kilometres ( trillion miles)
|-
|≈  astronomical units
|-
|≈  parsecs
|}

Before 1984, the tropical year (not the Julian year) and a measured (not defined) speed of light were included in the IAU (1964) System of Astronomical Constants, used from 1968 to 1983.

Other high-precision values are not derived from a coherent IAU system. A value of  found in some modern sources is the product of a mean Gregorian year (365.2425 days or ) and the defined speed of light. Another value, is the product of the J1900.0 mean tropical year and the defined speed of light.

Abbreviations used for light-years and multiples of light-years are
"ly" for one light-year
"kly" for a kilolight-year (1,000 light-years)
"Mly" for a megalight-year (1,000,000 light-years)
"Gly" for a gigalight-year (1,000,000,000 light-years)

History

The light-year unit appeared a few years after the first successful measurement of the distance to a star other than the Sun, by Friedrich Bessel in 1838. The star was 61 Cygni, and he used a  heliometre designed by Joseph von Fraunhofer. In those terms, trigonometric calculations based on 61 Cygni's parallax of 0.314 arcseconds, showed the distance to the star to be . Bessel added that light takes 10.3 years to traverse this distance. He recognized that his readers would enjoy the mental picture of the approximate transit time for light, but he refrained from using the light-year as a unit. He may have resisted expressing distances in light-years because it would reduce the accuracy of his parallax data due to multiplying with the uncertain parameter of the speed of light.

The speed of light was not yet precisely known in 1838; the estimate of its value changed in 1849 (Fizeau) and 1862 (Foucault). It was not yet considered to be a fundamental constant of nature, and the propagation of light through the aether or space was still enigmatic.

The light-year unit appeared in 1851 in a German popular astronomical article by Otto Ule. Ule explained the oddity of a distance unit name ending in "year" by comparing it to a walking hour (Wegstunde).

A contemporary German popular astronomical book also noticed that light-year is an odd name. In 1868 an English journal labelled the light-year as a unit used by the Germans. Eddington called the light-year an inconvenient and irrelevant unit, which had sometimes crept from popular use into technical investigations.

Although modern astronomers often prefer to use the parsec, light-years are also popularly used to gauge the expanses of interstellar and intergalactic space.

Usage of term

Distances expressed in light-years include those between stars in the same general area, such as those belonging to the same spiral arm or globular cluster. Galaxies themselves span from a few thousand to a few hundred thousand light-years in diameter, and are separated from neighbouring galaxies and galaxy clusters by millions of light-years. Distances to objects such as quasars and the Sloan Great Wall run up into the billions of light-years.

Calculation
The way to calculate the light-year distance:

where:

 299 792 458 is the number of meters light travels in one second
 60 is the number of seconds in a minute
 The other 60 is the number of minutes in an hour
 24 is the number of hours in a day
 365.25 is the number of days in a Julian year

Related units
Distances between objects within a star system tend to be small fractions of a light-year, and are usually expressed in astronomical units. However, smaller units of length can similarly be formed usefully by multiplying units of time by the speed of light. Units such as the light-minute, light-hour and light-day are sometimes used in popular science publications. The light-month, roughly one-twelfth of a light-year, is also used occasionally for approximate measures. The Hayden Planetarium specifies the light month more precisely as 30 days of light travel time.

Light travels approximately one foot in a nanosecond; the term "light-foot" is sometimes used as an informal measure of time.

See also 
 1 petametre (examples of distances on the order of one light-year)
 Distance measures (cosmology)
 Einstein protocol
 Hubble length
 Orders of magnitude (length)

Notes

References

External links 

 

Light
Units of length
Units of measurement in astronomy
Concepts in astronomy
1838 in science